The Hon. Steven Ernest Linares is a Gibraltarian teacher, trade unionist, barrister and politician affiliated to the Liberal Party of Gibraltar (LPG). He is an MP at the Gibraltar Parliament and as of December 2011 formed part of the Government of Gibraltar as Minister for Sport, Culture, Heritage, Youth, Utilities, Refuse Collection, Fire Service, Civil Contingencies and Postal Services. Since June 2021, Linares is the Minister for Housing, Employment, Youth and Sport.

Biography 
Linares was one of the first admitted to the Bayside Comprehensive School, along with Peter Montegriffo, Gilbert Licudi and Dominique Searle. He worked in several positions (Barclays Bank, Retco. etc.) before, at the age of 23, enrolling at Leeds Trinity University College where he received his B.Ed. (Hons.) in 1987. In 1988 he taught at St Joseph's Middle School and then for twelve years at the Bishop Fitzgerald Middle School before being elected to Parliament in the 2000 general elections.

Affiliated in 1989 to the Gibraltar Teachers' Association (GTA), Linares was also a member of Gibraltar Socialist Labour Party (GSLP), where he remained until 1992. That year, he joined the Gibraltar National Party (later Liberal Party of Gibraltar) and chose to focus more on union issues. He became vice president of the GTA in 1993 and president in 1995. He was elected to the Gibraltar Trades Council in 1994 and was president of the Gibraltar Representative Organisation from 1993 to 1995, where he worked with Jaime Netto and Joe Holliday.

In 1996, with the defeat of the National Party in the general elections and its transformation into the Liberal Party, Linares was one of the architects of the rapprochement between the LP and the GSLP. In 2000, he became Shadow Minister for Education, Training, Youth and Culture.

In 2009, he became a barrister in the UK, and in 2010 in Gibraltar. Linares attended the University of Wolverhampton (LLB), University of the West of England (Bristol) and is a member of Middle Temple. As a barrister, he worked for the law firm Charles Gomez & Co.

In 2011, with the GSLP/Liberal Alliance's victory in the general elections, Linares was appointed Minister for Sport, Culture, Heritage, Youth, Utilities, Refuse Collection, Fire Service, Civil Contingencies and Postal Services. Since June 2021, Linares is the Minister for Housing, Employment, Youth and Sport.

In 2020 was appointed Chairperson of the Climate Justice Committee of Liberal International.

As Minister for Culture, he was a pioneer in bringing to Gibraltar and organising the Gibraltar Music Festival Gibraltar_Music_Festival

Married in 1992 and a father of 3, Linares enjoys Sports in general, international Politics and outdoor pursuits and has hiked Toubkai Atlas Mountains in Morocco the Inca Trials in Peru and the Kilimanjaro Tanzania Uhuru Peaks.

References

External links 

 Steven Linares – Government of Gibraltar official site
 Steven Linares shows support for GB Olympic Squad
 Gibraltar in Czech Republic culture mission

Alumni of the University of Leeds
Alumni of the University of the West of England, Bristol
Alumni of the University of Wolverhampton
Government ministers of Gibraltar
Liberal Party of Gibraltar politicians
Gibraltarian barristers
Living people
Alumni of Leeds Trinity University
Year of birth missing (living people)
21st-century Gibraltarian lawyers